Śmigus-dyngus is a Roman Catholic celebration held on Easter Monday across Central Europe, and in small parts of Eastern and Southern Europe. The tradition is widely associated with Poland and is observed by Polish Diaspora communities, particularly among Polish Americans who call it Dyngus Day.

Traditionally, boys throw water over girls and spank them with pussy willow branches (in some regions) on Easter Monday. This is accompanied by a number of other rituals, such as making verse declarations and holding door-to-door processions, in some regions involving boys dressed as bears or other creatures. The origins of the celebration are uncertain, but it may date to pagan times before 1000 AD; it is described in writing as early as the 15th century. It continues to be observed throughout Central Europe and also in the United States, where certain patriotic American elements have been added to the traditional Polish ones.

Origins and etymology

The celebration has been traced back to the 14th century but may have earlier, pre-Christian origins involving the celebration of the March equinox. The origins of the word dyngus are obscure as it may come from the German Dingeier ("owed eggs", the Easter eggs that are to be given to children) or Dingnis, Dingnus (ransom paid during the war to protect against pillaging). 

The occurrence of the celebration across the Western Slavic and Lechitic nations, including Hungary, suggests a common origin in pagan religion, most likely a link with the Slavic goddesses of fertility. It may possibly be related to the tradition of watering the Corn Mother, who made crops grow and was represented in the form of a doll or wreath made from corn. This would be symbolically drenched in water and kept over the winter until its grain was mixed with the seed corn in the spring to ensure a successful harvest. In time, the growing influence of Christianity in Poland incorporated the dyngus celebrations, along with other pagan practices, into Christian festivals like Easter Monday.

Some have suggested that the use of water is an allusion to the baptism of Mieszko I, the Duke of West Polans (c. 935–992) in 966 AD, uniting all of Poland under the banner of Christianity. The New Cambridge Medieval History, however, suggests that it originated far to the west of Poland and was adopted under German influence. Originally śmigus and dyngus were two separate events, with śmigus involving the act of throwing water (oblewanki), and dyngus, bribing people with pisanki to escape from śmigus; later both traditions merged. Attempts have been made to curtail it; in 1410 it was forbidden by the Bishop of Poznań in an edict titled Dingus Prohibetur, which instructed residents not to "pester or plague others in what is universally called Dingus".

Poland

The festival is traditionally celebrated by boys throwing water over girls they like and spanking them with pussy willows. Boys would sneak into girls' homes at daybreak on Easter Monday and throw containers of water over them while they were still in bed.

After all the water had been thrown, the screaming girls would often be dragged to a nearby river or pond for another drenching. Sometimes a girl would be carried out, still in her bed, before both bed and girl were thrown into the water together. Particularly attractive girls could expect to be soaked repeatedly during the day. The use of water is said to evoke the spring rains needed to ensure a successful harvest later in the year. Girls could save themselves from a soaking by giving boys "ransoms" of painted eggs (pisanki), regarded as magical charms that would bring good harvests, successful relationships and healthy childbirths. Although in theory the girls are supposed to wait until the following day to get their revenge by soaking the boys, in practice both sexes throw water over each other on the same day.

Pussy willows appear to have been adopted as an alternative to the palm leaves used elsewhere in Easter celebrations, which were not obtainable in Poland. They were blessed by priests on Palm Sunday, following which parishioners whipped each other with the pussy willow branches, saying Nie ja bije, wierzba bije, za tydzień, wielki dzień, za sześć noc, Wielkanoc ("It's not me who strikes, the willow strikes, in a week, holy day, in six nights, Easter"). The pussy willows were then treated as sacred charms that could prevent lightning strikes, protect animals and encourage honey production. They were believed to bring health and good fortune to people as well, and it was traditional for three pussy willow buds to be swallowed on Palm Sunday to promote good health. As with the water-throwing, boys would whip girls with pussy willows on Easter Monday and girls would do the same to boys on the following Tuesday.

The celebration would traditionally be accompanied by declarations in verse, in which a young man would climb on the roof of a building in the village, beat on a tin pan and announce which girls were to be doused along with how many wagon-loads of sand, how much water and how much soap would be used on each girl. The girls would also respond in verse, announcing that there was someone who would save her. For instance,

A dyngus procession would also be held, either on Easter Monday or Tuesday. A parade of boys would take part in a march known as chodzenie po dyngusie – "going on the dyngus" – or z kogutkiem – "with the cockerel", a reference to the use of a live bird, usually taken without permission and stuffed with grain soaked in vodka to make him crow loudly. (A decorated and carved wooden rooster was sometimes used as an alternative.) The rooster was a symbol of fertility, carried on a small two-wheeled wagon which had been painted red and decorated with ribbons and flowers, to which was often also added small puppets representing a wedding party. This would be pushed from door to door by the boys, who would crow like roosters and sing dyngus songs conveying good wishes and requests for gifts and food. Their objective was to encourage the inhabitants to give them food from their Easter tables, such as Easter eggs, ham and sausages. A typical dyngus song went:

Your duck has told me
That you've baked a cake
Your hen has told me
She's laid you a basket and a half of eggs
Your sow has told me that you've killed her son
If not her son then her little daughter
Give me something if only a bit of her fat
Who will not be generous today
Let him not count on heaven.

In some regional variants of po dyngusie, the boys would march through the village with one of their number dressed as a bear with a bell on his head – either wearing a real bearskin or a stand-in made of pea vines. The group would go from door to door collecting "gifts for the bear" before "drowning" the bear in a nearby stream or pond. This was probably an adaptation of a traditional ceremony to drown a straw figure of Marzanna, the spirit of winter. The "bears" were often invited in as they were believed to ensure that there would be a good harvest, reflecting a very ancient belief in the power of the bear to prevent evil, encourage crop growth and cure diseases. In the historical regions of Mazovia and Lesser Poland, boys wearing bearskins would also chase girls. A similar custom is seen in the Siwki Easter tradition.

Girls had their own version of po dyngusie in which they would go from door to door carrying a freshly cut green branch or gaj, seeking food and singing songs welcoming the "new year" that followed Easter:

Our green little tree, beautifully decked
Goes everywhere
For it is proper that it should
We go with it to the manor house
Wishing good fortune, good health
For this new year
Which God has given us.

Families would also visit each other on the same day to deliver presents of Easter eggs or rolls, receiving in return gifts of food from the Easter table.

Hungary

In Hungary, the custom is most commonly known as "locsolkodás" (sprinkling). Traditionally, young men splashed young women with water, though today, young women and girls are more likely to be sprayed with perfume. In return, women are expected to provide men with either painted eggs or a drink of palinka.

United States

Buffalo, New York 
Dyngus Day is observed in many Polish American communities, including Buffalo, New York. The Buffalo dyngus celebrations started in the 1960s as an effort by the Polish-American community in the city to find a new focus for its identity. It proved hugely successful, to the point that a local newspaper claimed that "everybody is Polish on Dyngus Day." It has become a fusion of Polish and American traditions, with polka bands, a parade, consumption of krupnik, and Polish food accompanying American patriotic songs sung in English. Party-goers dress up in the white-and-red colors of the Polish flag and carry balloons saying "Happy Dyngus Day" in English.

Cleveland, Ohio 
Dyngus Day in Cleveland is celebrated with a parade, polka, and the crowning of Miss Dyngus.  Large celebrations are centered on several West Side neighborhoods, including Ohio City, Tremont, and Detroit-Shoreway.  The epicenter of the celebration is held at Gordon Square.  A notable local leader of the celebration is DJ Kishka, playing mostly polka and Cleveland-style Polka.  Relatedly, Cleveland is home to the Polka Hall of Fame.  Cleveland contains a strong Polish American community, including five churches in the city limits who continue to say Mass in the Polish language-St. Stanislaus, St. Casimir, St. Barbara, Immaculate Heart of Mary, and St. John Cantus.

Macedon, New York 

Dyngus Day in Macedon, New York, and its sister village Hoosick Falls, is celebrated with a town festival and folk dressed along Appian Way. Local celebrations are often held as well as festivals where local residents wear bright, green colors.

South Bend, Indiana 
Dyngus Day is also celebrated annually in South Bend, Indiana and the surrounding region, including in LaPorte, Indiana.  In South Bend, the day marks the official beginning to launch the year's political primary campaign season (particularly among Democrats)- often from within the West Side Democratic Club, the M.R. Falcons Club, Z.B. Falcons, the South Bend Firefighters' Association and local pubs and fraternal halls. Notable politicos who have celebrated Dyngus Day in South Bend include Robert F. Kennedy; former Governor Joe Kernan; Senator Evan Bayh; former Congressman and New York University President John Brademas; former Maryland Lt. Governor Kathleen Kennedy Townsend; former Congressman, 9/11 Commission member and former Ambassador to India Timothy J. Roemer; former President Bill Clinton; the famous philanthropist Thomas A. White; and the late Aloysius J. Kromkowski, a long time elected St. Joseph County public servant, for whom the "Al Kromkowski polka" is named. Visitors in 2008 included then–senators Barack Obama and Hillary Clinton.

Robert F. Kennedy's 1968 appearance was marked by his downtown rally attended by a crowd of over 6,000, his participation in the Dyngus Day parade, and his leading of the crowds at the West Side Democratic Club in the traditional Polish well-wishing song Sto Lat (phonetic: 'sto laht') which means [may you live] "100 years". Indiana was RFK's first primary and first primary victory, which set in motion momentum and victories that may have led to his nomination as the Democratic Party candidate for president had he not been assassinated.

Pasadena, California 

At the California Institute of Technology, the Blacker House celebrates Dyngus Day. As they already have a long-standing tradition of waiters at dinners "dumping" attendees who act out of order, Dyngus Day provides an additional excuse for the waiters to dump attendees of the opposite sex. Dumps are accompanied by light slaps by a twig from the courtyard tree, and a volunteering Senior reads a Dyngus Day poem (as songs are banned during dinner).

Pine Creek, Wisconsin 
In the Polish-American community of Pine Creek, Wisconsin, when throwing water over the girls, the boys would chant Dyngus, dyngus, po dwa jaja; nie chcę chleba tylko jaja ("Dyngus, dyngus, for two eggs; I don't want bread, only eggs").

See also 
Easter whip
Water Festival Southeast Asian celebration with some similarities but a different religious and cultural background.

Notes

References

External links

 Śmigus-Dyngus: Poland's National Water Fight Day on Culture.pl

Czech traditions
Slovak traditions
Hungarian traditions
Easter traditions in Poland
Ukrainian traditions
Serbian traditions
Slavic holidays
Holidays based on the date of Easter
Polish-American culture in Buffalo, New York